Coyle Girelli is an English recording artist, multi-platinum selling composer, songwriter, record producer and multi-instrumentalist. Formerly frontman of alternative rock bands Your Vegas and The Chevin he released his debut solo album, Love Kills, in 2018. He has written songs for BTS, Macklemore, Robin Schulz, Westlife and many others, including the BTS worldwide number 1 single "Heartbeat" and co-composed songs for the record breaking French musicals Robin des Bois and Les Trois Mousquetaires. His sophomore solo album Funland was released in February 2022 to critical acclaim.

Early life
Girelli was born in Ascot, Berkshire and grew up in Otley, West Yorkshire. There he attended Prince Henry's Grammar School where he met the 3 other founding members of Your Vegas.

Girelli attended University of Leeds, completing a degree in Law and Criminology. He is a fan of English football side Manchester City.

Music career

Your Vegas 2005-2011 
Girelli, along with Mat Steel, Jon Langford, Mal Taylor and Mark Heaton, formed alternative rock band Your Vegas in 2005 while studying at Leeds University. He was the singer and songwriter in Your Vegas. The band released several self-produced singles in the UK before signing to Universal Republic in 2007 and releasing debut album A Town And Two Cities in May 2008.

The band extensively toured across the US and Canada, completing a series of North American tours including two tours with The Bravery, two full North American tours with Duran Duran and a run with Shiny Toy Guns. Your Vegas performed at various US Music festivals, including The Bamboozle, Bonnaroo, Lollapalooza, SXSW and All Points West.

Girelli made his network television with Your Vegas in the US on Last Call with Carson Daly with Your Vegas.

Your Vegas founded their own celebrity football team along with MLS Magazine called Champions United.  On 22 November 2008, they played a charity football match against Hollywood United. Proceeds raised from the event went towards helping hurricane victims in Houston.  Since the event, Girelli has participated in a number of Hollywood United games and events.

Steven Spielberg's Discovery Channel documentary Rising: Rebuilding Ground Zero to commemorate the 10th anniversary of the 11 September terrorist attack in New York used "Salvador" written by Girelli as its theme music.

The Chevin 2011-2015 
In 2010 Girelli founded British alternative band The Chevin together with former Your Vegas bandmates Langford, Steel and Taylor. Girelli wrote and produced debut release The Champion EP released on Fierce Panda in the UK. He also wrote debut album Borderland produced by American producer Noah Shain.
Lead single "Champion" along with several other of his songs from album Borderland  have appeared in films, trailers, commercials, computer games and television shows across the globe, including "Champion" on the FIFA 13 soundtrack.

The band toured extensively across North America and Europe, including tours with Franz Ferdinand, White Lies, Airborne Toxic Event and The Pigeon Detectives and festival appearances at Firefly Music Festival, T In The Park, Lollapalooza, SXSW Music Festival, Live at Leeds, Camden Crawl, The Great Escape Festival and Bingley Music Live.

Girelli made several network television appearances with The Chevin including on the Late Show with David Letterman and on Conan.

After a hiatus from 2014, The Chevin began releasing new music in summer 2019 with singles "Under The Thunder" and "Big Machine."

Songwriting
Girelli writes songs and produces for many other major label recording artists and his releases include BTS, Macklemore, Westlife, Daisy the Great, Robin Schulz, Echosmith, Sister Sparrow & The Dirty Birds, Spencer Ludwig, Alex Winston, The Movielife, Story Untold, Peking Duk, Rozes, Sam Feldt, Asher Roth, and Arty. He has collaborated with songwriters including Linda Perry, Mac Davis, The Stereotypes, LP, Scott Harris, Amy Allen (songwriter), Dan Nigro and Sterling Fox.
He appeared on stage with Peking Duk as a guest vocalist several times including performances at Lollapalooza and Electric Zoo and their 2018 US and European tours.

In 2015 Girelli composed music for short film Shaded Reflections which was selected for the Cannes Film Festival and the Manhattan Film Festival where he won the award for 'Best Original Song'.

In 2016 Girelli founded a New York City based independent record label called Honey Lemon Records. He has released several New York based artists on the label including French singer Livia Blanc and The Dawn of MAY.

Musical theater
He co-composed the 2013 French musical sensation Robin des Bois along with Micheal Malih, David Hallyday, Fred Château, Mathieu Mendès, Corneille, Shaka Ponk, John Mamann and Stanislas. His song "Gloria" from the show also appears on opera singer Vincent Niclo's 2013 album Luis.
Girelli co-composed the 2016 French musical Les 3 Mousquetaires.
He is currently working on several new musical theater projects in New York City and Europe.

In January 2023 Girelli released single "True Love Forever" together with an announcement of a new theatrical show created in collaboration with immersive theater company Third Rail Projects. The show is titled "True Love Forever."

Love Kills 2018-2020 
In 2017 Girelli announced on Twitter that he is working on a debut solo record Love Kills to be released in summer 2018.

Debut single "Where's My Girl?" was released 11 May 2018 described by Clash Magazine as a "swooning knee trembler". Follow up single "My Blue Heart" was released on 8 June 2018.

The 11 track album "Love Kills" was released to widespread acclaim on 21 September 2018. Atwood Magazine called the album "A beautifully dark masterpiece"" while High Voltage Magazine called it "possibly be the most surprising musical diamond find of the year". with Girelli's vocal performance frequently compared to Roy Orbison and Elvis Presley

The song "In Your Arms", from 'Love Kills' was used in season 2, episode 2 of Netflix TV show StartUp.
An early version of "Naked Soul" was used as the music for a Naked Cashmere campaign with a video made featuring supermodel Kate Moss. "Naked Soul" also featured in the 2019 Peter Lindbergh documentary 'Peter Lindbergh – Women's Stories.'

"Something Strange in the Night" from 'Love Kills' was used in Season 4, Episode 3 of Netflix show Chilling Adventures of Sabrina.

"Naked Soul" from 'Love Kills' was used in MTV show Catfish: The TV Show Season 8, Episode 33

Girelli recorded a version of The Verve classic Bittersweet Symphony for Sacha Gervasi's Emmy Award nominated HBO film My Dinner with Hervé released in October 2018.

In November 2018 Girelli released "Christmas And Me" EP featuring two original songs, "Christmas And Me Are Through" and "The Lights" as well as covers of O Holy Night, I'll Be Home For Christmas and Christmas Don't Be Late.

Funland 2021 - 2023 
In October 2021 Girelli released single "Fun," the first single from his sophomore album "Funland."

"Funland" was released to critical acclaim on February 25, 2022, with Rolling Stone Australia calling it "a contender for record of the year." AAA Backstage stated “Girelli has a certain type of song writing that oozes a sense of beauty and feeling. A lot of artists write lovely albums but this one from start to finish is that of a masterpiece.... “. Atwood Magazine described its sound as “Soaring and cinematic.”

An acoustic album called "Stripped" featuring several acoustic versions of songs on Funland as well as a cover of the Leonard Cohen song Famous Blue Raincoat and of the First Aid Kit (band) song "Fireworks" was released on July 22, 2022.

Artist discography

Solo 

Studio albums
Love Kills – Coyle Girelli (21 September 2018)
Funland – Coyle Girelli (25 February 2022)
Stripped – Coyle Girelli (22 July 2022)
tbc – Coyle Girelli (2023)

Extended plays
Christmas And Me EP – Coyle Girelli (30 November 2018)

Singles
 "Where's My Girl?" – Coyle Girelli (11 May 2018)
 "My Blue Heart" – Coyle Girelli (8 June 2018)
 "Disappear" – Coyle Girelli (17 August 2018)
 "Love Kills" – Coyle Girelli (14 September 2018)
 "The Lights" – Coyle Girelli (23 November 2018)
 "Fun" – Coyle Girelli (1 October 2021)
 "From 7th Street with Love" – Coyle Girelli (17 November 2021)
 "Here Comes My Baby" – Coyle Girelli (12 January 2022)
 "Do You Wanna Dance?" – Coyle Girelli (16 February 2022)
 "Famous Blue Raincoat / Fireworks" – Coyle Girelli (6 July 2022)
 "Modern Noir - Stripped" – Coyle Girelli (13 July 2022)
 "True Love Forever" – Coyle Girelli (27 January 2023)

With The Chevin 

Studio albums
Borderland – The Chevin (So Recordings 2012)

Extended plays
Champion EP – The Chevin (Fierce Panda 2011)

Singles
"Drive" – The Chevin (So Recordings, 28 May 2012) 
"Blue Eyes" – The Chevin (So Recordings, 6 August 2012) – (UK only) 
"Champion" – The Chevin (So Recordings, 7 August 2012)
"Under The Thunder" – The Chevin (So Recordings, 21 August 2019)
"Big Machine" – The Chevin (So Recordings, 16 October 2019)

With Your Vegas 

Studio albums
A Town And Two Cities – Your Vegas (Universal Republic 2008)

Extended playsYour Vegas EP – Your Vegas (Epic 2006) Flybuzz EP – Your Vegas (Epic 2006) A Town And Two Cities EP – Your Vegas (Universal Republic 2008)

Singles
"Your Vegas" – Your Vegas (Epic, January 2006) UK
"Flybuzz" – Your Vegas (Epic, August 2006) UK
"The Way The War Was Won" – Your Vegas (2008) US
"In My Head" – Your Vegas (Universal Republic, June 2008) US
"Christmas And Me Are Through" – Your Vegas (Primary Wave, 20 January 2009)

Other songs
 "Naked Soul" – Coyle Girelli 2016 – (Kate Moss for Naked Cashmere campaign)
 "Bittersweet Symphony" – Schukulu feat. Coyle Girelli 2018 – (Recorded for Sacha Gervasi's HBO film My Dinner with Hervé.)

As featured artist
 "On Your Own" – Serge Devant (feat. Coyle Girelli) 2012
 "Something For Nothing" – Asher Roth (feat. Coyle Girelli) 2014
 "Something For Nothing" – Blended Babies (feat. Coyle Girelli) 2015
 "Dragonfly" – Blended Babies (feat. Coyle Girelli) 2016
 "Beautiful Girl" – Blended Babies (feat. Coyle Girelli) 2017
 "Neon Rose" – Neon Tiger (feat. Coyle Girelli) 2017
 "Digital Perfection" – LEFTI (feat. Coyle Girelli) 2017
 "Supposed To Be" – Arty (feat. Coyle Girelli) 2017
 "Galaxies" – Nicolas Haelg 2018
 "Song Goes On" - Keli Holiday (feat. Coyle Girelli) 2021

Musical theater
 Robin des Bois (2013)
 Les Trois Mousquetaires (2016)
 True Love Forever (2023)

Television
{| class="wikitable sortable"
|-
! Year !! Title !! Role !! class="unsortable" | Notes
|-
| 2008 || Last Call With Carson Daly || rowspan="3"|himself|| Musical guest 
|-
| 2012 || The Late Show with David Letterman|| Musical Guest
|-
| 2012 || Conan'' ||  Musical Guest

Tours
 UK Tour (with The Bluetones 2005)
 UK Tour (with Shed Seven 2005)
 Highlands and Islands Tour (2005)
 UK Tour (Headline 2006)
 North America Tour (with The Bravery 2008)
 North America Red Carpet Massacre Tour Part 1 (with Duran Duran 2008)
 US Tour (with Shiny Toy Guns 2008)
 US Tour (Headline 2008)
 North America Red Carpet Massacre Tour Part 2 (with Duran Duran 2008)
 US Tour (A Town And Two Cities Tour 2008)
 UK Tour (Headline 2011)
 UK Tour (with The Airborne Toxic Event 2011)
 UK Tour (with The Pigeon Detectives 2011)
 European Tour (with White Lies 2011)
 European Tour (with Franz Ferdinand 2012)
 European Tour (with The Pigeon Detectives 2012)
 UK Tour (Headline 2012)
 European Tour (Headline 2012)
 US Tour (with The Airborne Toxic Event 2012)
 North America Tour (with The Psychedelic Furs & The Lemonheads 2012)
 European Tour (Headline 2013)
 North America Tour (with Peking Duk 2018)
 European Tour (with Peking Duk 2018)
 North America Tour (with Jukebox the Ghost 2022)
 North America Tour (with The Psychedelic Furs 2022)

Music videos

References

External links

Year of birth missing (living people)
Living people
People educated at Prince Henry's Grammar School, Otley
Musicians from Leeds